Proctolabus mexicanus is a species of short-horned grasshopper in the family Acrididae. It is found in Mexico.

References

External links

 

Acrididae
Insects of Mexico
Insects described in 1859